Sailing Home is the fifth studio album by Australian musician, Seaman Dan. The album was released in 2003.

At the ARIA Music Awards of 2009, the album won the ARIA Award for Best World Music Album.

Track listing 
 "Sailing the Southeast Wind"
 "Lighthouse"
 "Mango Rain"
 "The Florida Sails Again"
 "Dock of the Bay"
 "Shimmering Blue"
 "Water"
 "Full Fathom Five"
 "Baba Waiar"
 "Mak Taim"
 "Saltwater Cowboy"

References 

2009 albums
ARIA Award-winning albums